is a passenger railway station located in the city of Takamatsu, Kagawa Prefecture, Japan. It is operated by JR Shikoku and has the station number "Y03".

Lines
The station is served by the JR Shikoku Yosan Line and is located 9.5 km from the beginning of the line at Takamatsu. Yosan line local, Rapid Sunport, and Nanpū Relay services stop at the station. These trains also stop at Hashioka.

Layout
Hashioka Station consists of a side platform and two staggered island platforms serving four tracks. The side platform, attached to the station building is designated platform 0. Track 1 is served by both platform 0 and platform 1 (island) and trains stopping there occasionally open their doors on both sides to allow passengers to quickly get from the island platform to the station building. Platforms 1 and 2 serve eastbound trains while platforms 3 and 4 serve westbound ones. A station building houses a waiting room and a JR ticket window (without a Midori no Madoguchi facility). Access to the island platforms is by means of two footbridges, one for each island. Two sidings branch of off the main tracks on either side.

Adjacent stations

History
After the railway as nationalized on 1 December 1906, Japanese Government Railways (JGR) took over the station and operated it as part of the Sanuki Line (later the Sanyo and then the Yosan Main Line). With the privatization of Japanese National Railways (JNR, the successor of JGR) on 1 April 1987, control of the station passed to JR Shikoku.

Surrounding area
Takamatsu City Hall Kokubunji General Center
Takamatsu City Kokubunji Junior High School
Takamatsu Municipal Kokubunji Northern Elementary School

See also
 List of railway stations in Japan

References

External links

Station timetable

Railway stations in Takamatsu
Railway stations in Japan opened in 1897